The Pavilhão Serra Van-Dunem is an Angolan indoor sporting arena located in Huambo. The arena, built on the occasion of the 2007 Afrobasket, along with the Pavilhão Acácias Rubras in Benguela, Pavilhão N.Sra do Monte in Huíla and the Pavilhão do Tafe in Cabinda, has a 2,010-seat capacity.

See also
 Pavilhão Acácias Rubras
 Pavilhão N.Sra do Monte
 Pavilhão do Tafe

References

Huambo
Huambo Province